Thomas Haney Secondary School is a public high school in Maple Ridge, British Columbia, Canada, under the authority of School District 42 Maple Ridge-Pitt Meadows. Athletic organizations within the school are known as the Thomas Haney Thunder.

Clubs
School clubs include the Model United Nations Club, an ice hockey program, the Student Council, the Gardening Club and the eSports team. The Model United Nations club  allows students to partake in numerous United Nations simulations across the year. Several Thomas Haney students were award winners.
The eSports team is run by Mark Biggar and Todd Goodman. The two teachers, along with an arsenal of students, host a LARP (Live Action Role Play) at the school annually.

Notable alumni
 Jonathan Scott
 Drew Scott
 Madeline Merlo

References

High schools in British Columbia
Maple Ridge, British Columbia
Educational institutions established in 1992
1992 establishments in British Columbia